William Fleming (1710 – 1743) was Archdeacon of Carlisle from 1735 until his death.

The only son of George Fleming, Bishop of Carlisle from 1734 to 1747, he was matriculated at The Queen's College, Oxford in 1727. He graduated B.A. in 1731, M.A. in 1733, B.C.L. and D.C.L. in 1742. He died on 17 March 1742.

Notes
 

 

1710 births
1743 deaths
People from Carlisle, Cumbria
Alumni of The Queen's College, Oxford
Archdeacons of Carlisle